Ian Brennan (born April 23, 1978) is an American screenwriter, director and actor. He is known for his work on the American television shows Glee, Scream Queens,  The Politician, and Dahmer – Monster: The Jeffrey Dahmer Story.

Early life
Brennan is the son of John and Charman Brennan. He is Irish Catholic and his father was a Paulist priest. Brennan spent four years at Prospect High School in Mount Prospect, Illinois during the mid-1990s, and was a member of the school show choir, which he did not find particularly enjoyable. He was friends with actress Jennifer Morrison. Brennan aspired to be an actor, and as his high school musical director was also the show choir director, he joined the choir to enhance his chance of being cast in musical productions. Brennan credits his high school theatre director John Marquette for inspiring him to act. The character Will Schuester in Glee is partially based on Marquette. Brennan went on to study theatre at Loyola University Chicago. He graduated in 2000, and acted for a time in Chicago, studying at The Second City Training Center and working with the Steppenwolf and Goodman Theatres, before moving to New York City to continue his acting career. He has performed in off-Broadway plays at the Vineyard, Playwrights Horizons and MCC Theatres. His early writing experience was limited to sketch pieces in high school and college plays he describes as "terrible".

Career
Brennan conceived the idea for Glee based on his own experience as a member of the Prospect High School show choir. He explained: "I find it interesting that there is something in everybody, a longing for something transcendent, particularly in a place like Mt. Prospect, a place that's very suburban and normal and plain. Even in places like that, there's this desire to shine. That's fascinating and very funny to me, especially when people try to accomplish this through show choir – which, to me, is inherently a little ridiculous." In 2005, a choir director at Prospect High was accused of inappropriate behavior with a student and was later convicted of aggravated criminal sexual abuse. Brennan was inspired by these events, and in August 2005, purchased a copy of Screenwriting for Dummies and wrote the first draft of Glee, initially envisioned as a film rather than a television series. He completed the script in 2005, but could not generate interest in the project for several years.

Mike Novick, a television producer and a friend of Brennan's from Los Angeles, was a member of the same gym as writer and producer Ryan Murphy, and gave him a copy of Brennan's script. Murphy had been in a show choir while at college, and as such felt he could relate to the script. Murphy and his Nip/Tuck colleague Brad Falchuk suggested that Glee be adapted to a television show format. The script was entirely re-written, and was picked up by Fox within 15 hours of being received. Murphy and Falchuk became the show's executive producers and showrunners, while Brennan is a co-executive producer and Novick is a producer. Brennan, Falchuk and Murphy wrote all of the show's episodes in the first two seasons, and were nominated for two 2010 Writers Guild of America Awards for Glee, with nominations in the Best Comedy Series and Best New Series categories. Glee concluded after its sixth season, which aired in early 2015.

Brennan, Falchuk and Murphy created Scream Queens, a comedy-horror series set on a college campus and in a hospital, that aired from September 2015 to December 2016, and starred Emma Roberts, Ariana Grande, Lea Michele, Keke Palmer, Abigail Breslin, and Jamie Lee Curtis.

Personal life
Brennan lives in both New York City and Los Angeles. He married actress Trilby Glover in September 2016 and the couple have two children, Blaise (born in April 2016) and Juno (born in August 2018).

Credits

References

External links
 
 Ian Brennan at the New York Times

1978 births
Living people
American television writers
American male television writers
American television producers
American people of Irish descent
American Roman Catholics
Upright Citizens Brigade Theater performers
Screenwriters from Illinois
21st-century American comedians